Raleigh is a gender-neutral, British-originated name meaning "deer's meadow". In 2021, it ranked as the 2242nd most popular given name for all genders. The surname Raleigh originates from the English county of Devon, and is now the 7067th most popular surname in the United States.

Notable people with the given name "Raleigh" include
Raleigh Aitchison (1887–1958), American baseball player
Rawle Alkins (born 1997), American basketball player
Raleigh DeGeer Amyx (1938–2019), American artifact collector
Rawle Barrow (1934–2014), Trinidadian sailor
Raleigh Black (1880–1963), Australian botanist
Rawle Brancker (1937–2021), Barbadian cricketer
Raleigh Brown (1921–2009), American politician
Raleigh Chichester-Constable (1890–1963), English soldier
Rawle Clarke (born 1952), Barbadian sprinter
Raleigh E. Colston (1825–1896), French-American professor
Rawle Cox (born 1960), American field hockey player
Raleigh Croshaw (1584–1624), English merchant
Rawle Douglin, Trinidadian priest
Raleigh Drennon (1908–1965), American football player
Raleigh W. Falbe (1890–1957), American politician and police officer
Raleigh Gilbert (1936–1998), British commentator
Raleigh Kirby Godsey (born 1936), American academic administrator
Raleigh Grey (1860–1936), British colonist
Rawle Marshall (born 1982), Guyanese-American basketball player
Raleigh McKenzie (born 1963), American football player
Raleigh Moncrief, American musician
Raleigh Rhodes (1918–2007), American soldier
Raleigh Roundtree (born 1965), American football player
Raleigh Ashlin Skelton (1906–1970), English historian
Raleigh Trevelyan (1923–2014), British author
Rawleigh Warner Jr. (1921–2013), American business executive
Raleigh Webb (born 1997), American football player
Rawleigh Williams III (born 1996), American football player

Notable people with the surname "Raleigh" include
Andy Raleigh (born 1981), English rugby league footballer
Ben Raleigh (1913–1997), American composer
Cal Raleigh (born 1996), American baseball player
Carew Raleigh (1550–1625), English naval commander
Carew Raleigh (1605–1666), English politician
Cecil Raleigh (1856–1914), English actor and playwright
David Raleigh, American singer-songwriter
Don Raleigh (1926–2012), Canadian ice hockey player 
Donald Raleigh (disambiguation), multiple people
Elizabeth Raleigh (1565–1647), English courtier
Gregory Raleigh (born 1961), American inventor
Jack Raleigh (1890–??), Irish hurler
John Raleigh (1887–1955), American baseball player
Justin Raleigh, American make-up artist
Kevin Raleigh (born 1952), American singer
Thomas Raleigh (1850–1920), British lawyer
Todd Raleigh (born 1969), American college baseball coach
Saba Raleigh (1862–1923), English actress
Sim Raleigh (1909–1934), English footballer
Wally Raleigh (1895–1960), Australian rules footballer
Walter Raleigh (disambiguation), multiple people

See also
Raleigh, North Carolina, a page for the largest city in North Carolina
Raleigh (disambiguation), a disambiguation page for "Raleigh"

Notes

English feminine given names
English masculine given names
English given names
English unisex given names
English-language surnames
Anglicised Irish-language surnames